Hansel Enmanuel Donato Domínguez, known as Hansel Enmanuel, (born 24 October 2003) is a Dominican college basketball player who plays for the Northwestern State Demons of the Southland Conference. He played high school basketball at Life Christian Academy in Kissimmee, Florida.

He went viral in early 2021 for his flashy dunks, passes, three-pointers and athleticism against top high school talent despite having only one arm due to a childhood incident.

Early life
Hansel was born in the Santo Domingo, Dominican Republic to Hansel Salvador Donato and Katia "Katy" Domínguez Pérez, and grew up in Los Mina, one of the poorest barrios in the city.

High school career
Hansel gained recognition in 2020 after posting videos on social media of him playing streetball in his hometown of Santo Domingo. In October, he appeared on national television when he was interviewed on  El Show Del Mediodia (The Noon Show) on Color Visión. Hansel moved to the United States in January 2021 after receiving a scholarship to play at Life Christian Academy in Kissimmee, Florida. The team's head coach, Moisés Micael, was an old teammate of his father's who saw his videos online and convinced him to make the move. Within weeks of his arrival his highlight videos went viral on social media again. His performance at the Orlando Winter Showdown further elevated his profile after he averaged 25 points and 11 rebounds per game throughout the tournament. He also began playing on the Amateur Athletic Union (AAU) circuit for SOH Elite. As a senior, Hansel averaged 25.9 points, 11 rebounds, 6.9 assists and 3.4 blocks per game while helping his team win a Central Florida Christian Academy state title.

Recruiting
Hansel was rated a three-star recruit by 247Sports. He received his first Division I offer from Tennessee State in August 2021. That offer was followed by an offer from Memphis in February 2022.

In June 2022, he announced that he was considering Memphis, Northwestern State and Bethune–Cookman, as well as the Overtime Elite professional league. He committed to Northwestern State on July 23.

College career
Hansel made his collegiate debut with Northwestern State on November 12, 2022, recording one steal and committing two fouls in eight minutes of play.

Personal life
At the age of six, Enmanuel lost his left arm when a cinderblock wall came down on him and trapped him for two hours, requiring amputation below the shoulder. Despite his life-altering injuries, he said he saw the experience as a "blessing." Forced to give up his preferred sport of baseball, he switched his focus to basketball thereafter. His father, himself a former professional basketball player, was initially against the idea because he thought he would get hurt, but later served as one of his biggest supporters.

Enmanuel is nicknamed Kikimita after his father, who was called Kikima in his playing days. Aside from his dad he cites LeBron James and Kevin Durant as his idols.

Social media and endorsements
Enmanuel has established a large social media following since moving to the United States. In April 2022, he signed a name, image, and likeness (NIL) deal with Banreservas, one of the largest financial institutions in his native Dominican Republic. He signed a deal with Gatorade, starring in a national commercial spot that aired in June as part of the brand's Fuel Tomorrow campaign.

References

External links
 Northwestern State Demons bio

Living people
2003 births
Dominican Republic men's basketball players
Dominican Republic expatriate basketball people in the United States
Sportspeople from Santo Domingo
Sportspeople with limb difference
Dominican Republic people with disabilities
Dominican Republic amputees